"Celebrity Skin" is a single by American alternative rock band Hole, released by Geffen Records on August 31, 1998. It is the debut single from their third studio album of the same name and is their most commercially successful single, being the only one to reach the top place on the US Modern Rock Tracks chart. In October 2011, NME ranked it the 126th best track of the past 15 years.

Composition

Music and arrangements
The song was written and recorded in 1997, after Hole's reported hiatus the previous year due to frontwoman Courtney Love's burgeoning film career. Love and Hole guitarist Eric Erlandson co-wrote the song with Smashing Pumpkins frontman Billy Corgan, whom Love later said provided the main guitar riff.

Lyrics

The lyrics, written by Love, contain several literary references; the line "Oh, look at my face / My name is might-have-been" is directly lifted from the opening verse of Dante Gabriel Rossetti's poem, "A Superscription," (and also quoted in Eugene O'Neill's Long Day's Journey into Night) while the phrase "pound of flesh" originates from William Shakespeare's The Merchant of Venice.

Commenting on the theme of celebrity, Love said: "Once you've stood onstage bleating your schoolgirl poetry, are you going to stay there, when you have the power and ability to give yourself a platform? I mean, here's the celebrity, and we all know it's stupid and ephemeral, but why not foster it? Why not feed it? Because all that it will do is give the thing that has substance – the art – more power." The song's title shares the name of an independent pornographic magazine of the same name showing celebrity nudity, as well as a short-lived punk rock group from Los Angeles that featured ex-Germs drummer Don Bolles. Love joked on Later... with Jools Holland in 1995 that the song was entitled "Celebrity Skin" "'cause [she] touched a lot of it."

Journalist Carrie Bell of Billboard noted in 1998 that the song dissects "the problem of maintaining an image and living in the public eye." Guitarist Eric Erlandson responded to this statement: "Courtney writes what she feels, and this is obviously one of her observations of Hollywood. We used this great hollow city as inspiration for the album."

Release
"Celebrity Skin" was released as the debut single of its eponymous album, Celebrity Skin, on August 31, 1998, reaching the top 10 on the US Billboard Modern Rock Tracks chart. It spent a total of 26 weeks on the chart, peaking at number one on October 10, 1998.

Critical response and legacy
NME referred to the track's musical elements as featuring a "balls-in-the-air guitar riff the size of Australia, and a production sheen that was the sonic equivalent of looking directly at the sun." In 2011, the same publication ranked the song number 126 on a list of the "150 Best Tracks of the Last 15 Years." James Hunter of Rolling Stone wrote of the song: "Hole are immediately in your face with the cheese-metal riffs and cuddly dissolves," deeming it "a track full of cloudless energy that seems to explode the malaise that has surrounded Love.". The song received two Grammy nominations for Best Rock Song, losing to "Uninvited" by Alanis Morissette and Best Rock Performance by a Duo or Group with Vocal, losing to "Pink" by Aerosmith.

Music video
The music video for "Celebrity Skin" was directed by Nancy Bardawil. The video features the band performing the song on a stage, women wearing pink-purple ball gowns hanging from the ceiling and the women later lifting up their skirts as they amble around the stage. The video design bears resemblance to a key sequence in the Marilyn Monroe film Gentlemen Prefer Blondes (1953). As well as performance footage, there are also a number of close-ups of Courtney Love and Melissa Auf der Maur lying in coffins. Patty Schemel, although still a member of the band at the time of shooting, does not appear in the video. Schemel was replaced by a lookalike (Samantha Maloney using red hair to emulate Schemel) and only informed a music video was planned after it was shot. The video was shot in black and white and the footage was colorized by Cerulean Fx in post-production.

Formats and track listings
All songs were written by Courtney Love, Eric Erlandson, and Billy Corgan except where noted.

UK CD single 
 "Celebrity Skin"2:47
 "Best Sunday Dress" (Love, Erlandson, Kat Bjelland)4:26
 "Dying" 3:08

UK 7-inch single 
 "Celebrity Skin"2:47
 "Best Sunday Dress" (Love, Erlandson, Bjelland)4:26

US promotional CD 
 "Celebrity Skin"2:47

EU limited edition CD 
 "Celebrity Skin" – 2:47
 "Best Sunday Dress" (Love, Erlandson, Bjelland)4:26
 "Dying" 3:08

Japanese CD single 
 "Celebrity Skin" – 2:47
 "Reasons To Be Beautiful" (Love, Erlandson, Melissa Auf der Maur, Charlotte Caffey, Jordon Zadorozny)5:19
 "Dying" 3:44

Credits and personnel
Hole
 Courtney Lovelead vocals, guitar
 Eric Erlandsonguitar 
 Melissa Auf der Maurbass, backing vocals

Guest musicians
 Deen Castronovodrums, percussion

Production
 Michael Beinhornproducer, programming
 Eric Erlandsonadditional producer

Charts

Weekly charts
Hole version

Doja Cat version

Year-end charts

Certifications

In popular culture
The song was used in the film American Pie, but did not appear on the soundtrack, as well as being featured in the intro of the video game NHL Rock The Rink, as well as the video games Rock Band and Sing Star as a playable track and downloadable content

It also appeared in the 2011 family film Hop. In 2012, the song was performed by Heather Morris and Chord Overstreet in the Glee episode "Makeover"

A line from the song inspired the alternative rock group Garbage to name their third album Beautiful Garbage.

The song was used in the "lip sync for your life" segment on the third episode of the tenth season of RuPaul's Drag Race, where Love was a guest judge.

In 2018, Love performed the song with Rockin'1000 in Florence being backed by 1500 musicians.

The song plays during the end credits of the 2019 film Captain Marvel.

An edited version of the song is also used in the trailer of the 2020 Netflix film Enola Holmes
It also appeared in the fifth episode of The Flight Attendant.

On February 11, 2022, rapper and singer Doja Cat released a cover of "Celebrity Skin" as a part of her Super Bowl LVI commercial for Taco Bell.

See also
 Number one modern rock hits of 1998
 List of RPM Rock/Alternative number-one singles (Canada)

Notes

References

Hole (band) songs
1998 singles
1998 songs
American power pop songs
Geffen Records singles
Song recordings produced by Michael Beinhorn
Songs written by Billy Corgan
Songs written by Courtney Love
Songs written by Eric Erlandson
Songs about fame